Lycocarpus is a genus of flowering plants belonging to the family Brassicaceae.

Its native range is Spain.

Species
Species:
 Lycocarpus fugax (Lag.) O.E.Schulz

References

Brassicaceae
Brassicaceae genera